Daniel Figueroa   (born February 19, 1983)  is a  professional baseball outfielder, who is currently with the Spain national baseball team.

Daniel played baseball at Gulliver Prep High School and the University of Miami. He was drafted by the Oakland Athletics in the 40th round of the 2004 MLB Draft but did not sign and by the Baltimore Orioles in the 43rd round of the 2005 MLB Draft. He played in the Orioles farm system through 2010 and spent 2011 in the American Association of Independent Professional Baseball.

He also played for the Spain national baseball team in the 2013 World Baseball Classic.

His identical twin brother, Paco Figueroa, was his teammate at Miami, both were drafted by the Orioles in 2005 and they played together in the minors and with the Spanish national team.

References

External links

1983 births
Baseball outfielders
Living people
2013 World Baseball Classic players
Delmarva Shorebirds players
Frederick Keys players
Bowie Baysox players
Aberdeen IronBirds players
Norfolk Tides players
Grand Prairie AirHogs players
Twin sportspeople